Aphanolaimidae is a family of nematodes belonging to the order Leptolaimida.

Genera:
 Anonchus Cobb, 1913
 Aphanolaimus de Man, 1880
 Aphanonchus Coomans & Raski, 1991
 Paraphanolaimus Micoletzky, 1922

References

Nematodes